The Sanasarian College was an Armenian-language educational institution in the city of Erzurum (called Karin by Armenians), Ottoman Empire founded in 1881 by an Armenian merchant, Mkrtich Sanasarian. Its students were children of primary and secondary school age. It also had a pedagogical department for the training of Armenian teachers and a trade school.

Description

It was a school of high grade which consisted of teachers who were mostly educated in Germany. The college had a nine-year course, with a high grade education that was taught. The school lasted until the Armenian genocide, when most of the teachers were killed and the building was ruined. Sanasarian college was a foremost institution for Armenian culture and education in the eastern provinces during the decades before World War I.

English explorer, writer, and natural historian Isabella Bird (1831–1904) described the college as follows:

After the Armenian genocide, and when the property was abandoned, the Sanasarian College was chosen as the location for the Erzurum Congress.

Legal status 
In 2012, the Armenian Patriarchate of Constantinople appealed to a court in Ankara for the return of the properties owned by the Sanasarian College. These properties include nine plots of land in Erzurum, a garden house and vast farmland in the village of Aghveren, two plots in the village of Gez, and a large commercial property known as Sanasarian Han in the Sirkeci district of Istanbul. The court proceedings are still pending.

Notable graduates
Karekin Pastermadjian
Grigoris Balakian
Vartkes Serengülian
Vartan Makhokhian

See also
Nersisian School
Education in the Ottoman Empire

References

Educational institutions established in 1881
Educational institutions disestablished in 1912
Western Armenia
Armenian schools
History of Erzurum
1881 establishments in the Ottoman Empire
1912 disestablishments in the Ottoman Empire